Bowlin Travel Centers, Inc. is a New Mexico-based family owned company that operates a chain of roadside convenience stores and travel centers found on highways in the American southwest. The stores are located primarily in the U.S. states of Arizona and New Mexico; their corporate headquarters are located in Albuquerque. The company's Chief Executive Officer is Michael L. Bowlin.

The stores are located along highways in New Mexico and offer additional amenities such as food from restaurant chains such as Subway, and Dairy Queen.

History 
The company's travel centers typically incorporate a Southwestern "trading post" theme, in the manner of small stores commonly found along Old Route 66 prior to the construction of the Interstate. Many were former independent businesses. They have names like "Flying C Ranch", "Old West", "Bowlin's Running Indian", and "Continental Divide". One location, called simply "The Thing" also incorporates another Route 66 tradition, the sideshow. Their retail products include Native American jewellery and food.

In 2003, the company operated 15 locations in Arizona and New Mexico and employed about 150 people in New Mexico; five of those travel centers have since been closed. Stores sell fuel branded Exxon or Shell, and many also incorporate a Dairy Queen.

Prior to 2000, the company operated as Bowlin Outdoor Advertising & Travel Centers Inc., however the Outdoor Advertising division was sold to Lamar Advertising in a stock swap valued at $27.2 million.

References 

Companies traded over-the-counter in the United States
Companies based in Albuquerque, New Mexico
Restaurants in Arizona
Restaurants in New Mexico
Transportation in Arizona
Transportation in New Mexico
Economy of the Southwestern United States
Convenience stores of the United States
Gas stations in the United States
Buildings and structures on U.S. Route 66
Tourist attractions along U.S. Route 66
American companies established in 1919
Retail companies established in 1919
Restaurants established in 1919
Truck stop chains
Family-owned companies of the United States